Soho Radio is an independent online radio station that broadcasts live from London and from New York. The studios are based in Soho, London, and in the Rockefeller Centre in New York It was founded in 2014, with the New York branch opening in November 2020.

Location 
Soho Radio broadcasts live from a street side studio in Soho, London. The original studio at 22C Great Windmill Street in Soho opened in 2014. The  studio featured a shop space at the front, used to host pop up residencies, shops, brands, and events.  In June 2019, they opened their second studio at 33 Broadwick Street in Soho. In December 2020, Soho Radio launched in New York, broadcasting live from the Rockefeller Centre.

Presenters
Soho Radio has over 250 resident presenters covering all genres, including Primal Scream's Simone Marie, dub legend Dennis Bovell, Groove Armada's Tom Findlay, UNKLE's James Lavelle, Jim Sclavunos of Nick Cave & The Bad Seeds, Metronomy’s Anna Prior, DJ Norman Jay MBE and Anton Newcombe of The Brian Jonestown Massacre.

Special hosts and guests include:

 Paul Weller                          
 Tony Allen
 IDLES
 Artwork 
 Seth Troxler
 Eats Everything 
 Sink The Pink
 Mark Ronson
 Professor Heinz Wolff
 Tim Burgess 
 Róisín Murphy
 Edwyn Collins 
 Nadine Shah
 Jools Holland
 Ezra Furman
 Mute Records
 4AD
 Ninja Tune
 Domino
 Rough Trade

Soho Radio Vinyl Sessions 
Soho Radio host Vinyl Sessions, with artists performing two tracks live as they cut the session direct to acetate. These special dub plates are then auctioned off for charity. The Soho Radio Vinyl Session with Paul Weller raised £2500 for the charity Shelter.

Session artists include:

 Paul Weller
 KT Tunstall 
 IDLES
 Seun Kuti
 Sampa The Great
 Tim Burgess
 Reuben James
 MckNasty
 Kay Young
 Field Music
 Steve Mason
 Madison McFerrin
 Skinny Pelembe
 Hejira
 Remi 
 Omar
 Joel Culpepper
 Terri Walker
 Jeffrey Lewis
 Ibibio Sound Machine
 Let's Eat Grandma

Awards 
Awarded Best Online Radio Station in the Mixcloud Online Radio Awards 2016
Awarded Event Of The Decade in Time Out magazine in 2019

References

External links
 

Internet radio stations in the United Kingdom